Muhammad Salem Arafat al-Qudwa (6 August 1946 – 16 December 2021) was a Palestinian politician. He served as the first Governor of the Gaza Governorate from 1996 to 2014. Al-Qudwa was an advisor to Yasser Arafat.

References

1946 births
2021 deaths
Palestinian politicians
Governors of Gaza Governorate
People from Jaffa